Richárd Bohus (born 9 April 1993) is a Hungarian swimmer. At the 2012 Summer Olympics he finished 22nd overall in the heats in the Men's 100 metre backstroke. Now he trains with Arizona State University.

Career

International Swimming League 
In 2019 Bohus was member of the 2019 International Swimming League representing Team Iron.

References

1993 births
Living people
Hungarian male swimmers
Olympic swimmers of Hungary
Swimmers at the 2012 Summer Olympics
Swimmers at the 2016 Summer Olympics
Swimmers at the 2020 Summer Olympics
Male backstroke swimmers
European Aquatics Championships medalists in swimming
World Aquatics Championships medalists in swimming
People from Békéscsaba
Sportspeople from Békés County
20th-century Hungarian people
21st-century Hungarian people